T-Bone, the Baby Sitter is a 1950 picture book written and illustrated by Clare Turlay Newberry. The book is about a mischievous cat. The book was a recipient of a 1951 Caldecott Honor for its illustrations.

References

1950 children's books
American picture books
Caldecott Honor-winning works